Perfect Exchange, also known as The Sting II, is a 1993 Hong Kong action comedy film written and directed by Wong Jing and starring Andy Lau and Tony Leung. The film was rated Category III by the Hong Kong motion picture rating system.

Plot
Mandy Chin (Andy Lau) plays poker with prison inspector Chung Cho-hung (Tony Leung), rich tycoon Lau Yiu-cho (Wan Chi Keung) and Singaporean gambler Chan Wah-lek (Natalis Chan) in Lau's casino and cheats with the help of his girlfriend, Lily (Christy Chung), and partner in crime, Gold Finger Chi (Liu Kai-chi) as the card dealers and wins over HK$6 million. Afterwards, Mandy and Chi were attacked by Lau's henchmen and engages in a car chase where Mandy evades them by crashing their cars leading to a big explosion. Mandy and Chi arrive at a disco bar where Chung was attempting to seduce Lily. After humiliating Chung, Mandy and Chi fight off some of Chung's subordinates and evades the rest in a footchase before cornering Chung in an elevator and beating him up.

Mandy and Chi return home and find Lau and his mistress, Mona (Anita Lee) holding Lily hostage while his top henchman, Pau (Wang Lung-wei) breaks Chi's leg. Lau, enraged that Mandy conned HK$4 million from him, blackmails Mandy to enter prison and interrogate his former subordinate, Robinson Shun (Kwan Hoi-san), who stole a total of HK$300 million treasury bond from him and promises to pay Mandy HK$10 million as a reward if he manages to have Robinson tell him the whereabouts of the bond within a month. Mandy and Lily sets up an act where she reports him for sexual harassment to get him arrested. However, due to lack of evidence, the judge does not adopt the case and Mandy resorts to throwing his shoe at the judge to get a one-month prison sentence for contempt of court and assaulting the judge.

Chung looked forward to torture Mandy in prison, but the latter bribes inmates Kei (Lee Siu-kei), Big Eye Kwong (Tommy Wong) and Crazy Bill (William Ho) for protection. Dinosaur (Chan Chi-fai), a henchman sent by Lau earlier to interrogate Robinson, attempts to assault the latter in the shower room but Mandy stops him and Dinosaur later breaks Robinson's leg. In the prison hospital, Robinson reveals to Mandy that Lau is actually his son-in-law who used to work for him and later cheated his assets and killed his daughter when she takes the HK$300 million treasury bond from Lau. Robinson attacks Lau with a cleaver out of anger and was arrested and imprisoned. Mandy has a change of heart after hearing this and Dinosaur warns him if he does not complete his job within two days, Chi will be in danger. Robinson overhears this but he believes Mandy to be a good person and asks him to take down and promises to give him the treasury bond if succeeds.

Knowing the treasury bond are hidden in Lau's villa, Mandy bribes Chung with HK$30 million to help him by wooing Mona. Mandy sneaks out of prison by hiding in the car of a Catholic social worker, Turkey Chu (Kingdom Yuen) and attempts to find the treasury bond at Lau's villa while Chung have sex with Mona in the bedroom of Lau's deceased wife. However, Mandy finds Chi's dead body while Lau also catches Chung and causes Chung to be arrested and imprisoned for home intrusion and indecent exposure. Chung and Mandy (who snuck back into prison) are assigned to the same cell with Dinosaur, who fights them with his henchmen until Robinson, Kwong, Kei and Bill were moved to the same cell.

On the night of Lau and Mona's engagement party, a riot erupts after Robinson tackles Dinosaur in the cafeteria. After Mandy and Chung defeat Pau, who was also sent into prison by Lau, the two sneak out from prison with Robinson amidst the chaos. Once out, Robinson reveals to Chung that the treasury bond is hidden in the pillow on the bed of the bedroom of Lau's wife (which Chung lay on earlier), Chung then knocks out Mandy and Robinson to get it for himself. Chung arrives at the party in Lau's villa but Lau discovers him and holds him at gunpoint. Mandy also arrives in time with a gun and shoots Lau after knocking Chung. With the help of Lily, Mandy lures Lau into killing Mona and Lau was arrested as a result, and Robinson pulls out hidden bonds from a lizard cage. Mandy, Chung and Robinson then sneak back into prison while dressed as paramedics in an ambulance. Mandy was acquitted of his sexual harassment charge, he gives Chung the HK$30 million check he promised earlier, which will only become available in 1997, the bonds are deposited in a Switzerland bank to generate interest while Mandy will travel around the world with Lily during four years.

Cast
Andy Lau as Mandy Chin (錢文迪), an expert gambler and swindler.
Tony Leung Ka-fai as Chung Cho-hung (鍾楚雄), a prison inspector who is nicknamed Killer Hung (殺手雄) for wooing countless women.
Christy Chung as Lily (莉莉), Mandy's girlfriend.
Kwan Hoi-san as Robinson (魯賓孫), a prison inmate framed by Lau, who also accumulated his assets.
Kingdom Yuen as Turkey Chu (朱火雞), a Catholic social worker who is attracted to Mandy and helped him sneak in and out of prison several times.
Anita Lee as Mona (夢娜), Lau's mistress who cheats on him with numerous men.
Natalis Chan as Chan Wah-lek (陳華叻), a nine-time poker champion from Singapore who loses to Mandy in a poker game.
Liu Kai-chi as Chi (阿智), nicknamed Gold Finger (金手指), Mandy's assistant and partner in crime.
Tommy Wong as Big Eye Kwong (大眼光), a prison inmate bribed by Mandy.
Wang Lung-wei as Pau (阿豹), Lau's top henchman.
Chan Chi-fai as Dinosaur (恐龍), Lau's henchman who was sent to interrogate Robinson in prison but was unsuccessful.
Lee Siu-kei as Brother Kei (基哥), a prison inmate bribed by Mandy.
Victor Hon as Brother Hung, a prison inmate.
William Ho as Crazy Bill (傻標), a prison inmate bribed by Mandy.
Wan Chi Keung as Lau Yiu-cho (劉耀祖), Robinson's son in-law who blackmails Mandy in order to seize a HK$300 million treasury bond.
Teddy Yip as Chung Cho-hung's adoptive father and a former sailor who was at sea when his wife cheated on him and have birth to Chung.
Lok Wai as the girlfriend Chung's father from Beijing who leaves him after causing him to suffer a heart attack while engaging in BDSM.
Pau Hon-lam as a judge who sentenced both Mandy and Chung to prison and a victim of the two's shoe throwing at their respective hearings.
Law Shu-kei as the prison warden.
Fung Wai-lung as Lau's henchman.
Sam Ho as Dog (食屎狗), Chung's subordinate.
Bobby Au-yeung
Carol Lee
Leung Siu-tik as a prison inmate
Kwan Yung as Inmate
Kong Miu-ting as a prison inmate and a prison guard in dual roles.
Ng Kwok-kin as a prison guard.
Chan Siu-wah as Chung's subordinate at disco
Fei Pak as a prison guard
Wong Wai-shun as Lau's henchman.

Reception

Critical
Perfect Exchange received relatively positive scores of 6.1/10 stars from the Internet Movie Database and 6.8/10 stars from Douban. Kenneth Brorsson of So Good Reviews gave the film a positive review and writes "It helps that a performer like Tony Leung is very game and while Andy Lau is the cool presence in addition to a character rarely being in danger, he's the lesser part of the double act. It just doesn't seem like a fit to have Lau this time around in such a jarring Wong Jing film that mixes the crazy, the silly, Lau going into prison on a rape charge and various, jarring pieces of violence scattered throughout. But it's bearable and actually funny in parts so therefore great success coming from Wong Jing."

Box office
The film grossed HK$27,912,327 at the Hong Kong box office during its theatrical run from 30 September to 20 October 1993 in Hong Kong.

See also
Andy Lau filmography
Wong Jing filmography
List of Hong Kong Category III films

References

External links

Perfect Exchange at Hong Kong Cinemagic

1993 films
1993 martial arts films
1993 action comedy films
1990s prison films
Hong Kong action comedy films
Hong Kong martial arts comedy films
Hong Kong prison films
Films about gambling
Prison comedy films
1990s Cantonese-language films
Films directed by Wong Jing
Films set in Hong Kong
Films shot in Hong Kong
1990s Hong Kong films